The Dutch intervention in Lombok and Karangasem took place in 1894, and is part of the string of Dutch interventions in and around Bali that led to complete colonization of both Bali and Lombok by the early 20th century.

Initial alliance
The island of Lombok inhabited by the Sasak who adopted Islam in the 16th century. Some Balinese groups from the Kingdom Karangasem had ruled in the western part of Lombok island, and one of them, the Mataram group, succeeded in gaining over the rest of the Balinese groups, especially the Singhasari, as well as the totality of the island in 1839. From that a rich Balinese Court culture developed in Lombok.

Contacts with the English, through G.P. King developed, foreign trade interests developed as the Dutch managed to stop English influence by signing a treaty with Mataram in 1843. Mataram was an ally of the Dutch during the Dutch intervention in Bali (1849), and was rewarded with the overlordship over Karangasem.

Sasak rebellion

Trouble erupted in 1891 when the Muslim Sasak of Eastern Lombok arose in rebellion against the Balinese ruler of Lombok, Anak Agung Gde Ngurah Karangasem. The rebellion, following rebellions in 1855 and 1871 which had already been quashed by the Mataram ruler, erupted when he requested thousands of troops from the Sasaks in order to make an attack on the Klungkung kingdom in Bali in an attempt to become the Supreme Ruler of Bali.

On 25 August 1891, the ruler's son Anak Agung Ketut Karangasem was sent against rebellious Praya, of the Lombok kingdom of Selaparang with 8,000 troops. On 8 September, 3,000 more troops were sent under the ruler's other son, Anak Agung Made Karangasem. As the royal army seemed in trouble, the ruler asked for the help of the vassal ruler of Karangasem, Anak Agung Gde Jelantik, to send him 1,200 elite troops to quash the rebellion. The war raged on from 1891 to 1894, and the Mataram army being the most advanced, complete with two modern warships, the Sri Mataram and the Sri Cakra, managed to occupy the rebellious villages and to surround the last Sasak resistance.

On 20 February 1894, the Sasak formally called for Dutch intervention and support. The Dutch, seeing these events as an opportunity to extend their control in the East Indies, chose to support the Sasak, who had asked for their protection, and the Dutch started to disrupt the importation of weapons and supplies from Singapore by the Balinese rulers.

Dutch intervention (July 1894)
The blockade did not suffice, and the Dutch demand for Mataram's submission was rejected. In July 1894 the Dutch chose to send a military expedition to topple the Mataram ruler. Three ships were sent from Batavia, the Prins Hendrik, the Koningin Emma and the Tromp, transporting 107 officer, 1,320 European soldiers, 948 indigenous soldiers and 386 horses.

From August 1894, the Balinese chose to resist the Dutch military presence. They attacked the 900-strong Dutch military camp by surprise at night at Mayura Palace in Cakranegara on 25 August 1894, and killed more than 500 soldiers, sailors and coolies. Included among the dead was General P.P.H. van Ham, commander of the expedition. The Dutch retreated and entrenched themselves in fortifications on the coast.

Dutch reinforcements (November 1894)
The Dutch returned with more reinforcements under General Vetter.  Mataram was attacked and utterly destroyed. On 8 November 1894, they made systematic artillery bombardments on the Balinese positions at Cakranegara and destroyed the palace, killing about 2,000 Balinese and losing 166 men.

By the end of November 1894, the Dutch had annihilated the Balinese positions, with thousands of dead, and the Balinese surrendered or committed puputan, ritual suicide.

Lombok and Karangasem became part of the Dutch East Indies, and were administered from Bali. Gusti Gede Jelantik was appointed as Dutch regent in 1894, and ruled until 1902.

The Lombok royal treasure was seized by the Dutch, including  of gold,  of silver, and jewelry. Soon Bangli and Gyanjar also accepted Dutch suzerainty, but southern Bali kept resisting until the Dutch intervention in Bali (1906).

See also
 History of Bali

Notes

History of Bali
Conflicts in 1894
June 1894 events
July 1894 events
August 1894 events
September 1894 events
October 1894 events
November 1894 events
1894 in the Netherlands
Dutch conquest of Indonesia